Sir Mohammed Fathi Ahmed Ibrahim  (born 3 May 1946) is a Sudanese-British billionaire businessman. He worked for several telecommunications companies, before founding Celtel, which when sold had over 24 million mobile phone subscribers in 14 African countries. After selling Celtel in 2005 for $3.4 billion, he set up the Mo Ibrahim Foundation to encourage better governance in Africa, as well as creating the Ibrahim Index of African Governance, to evaluate nations' performance.  He is also a member of the Africa regional advisory board of London Business School.

In 2007 he initiated the Mo Ibrahim Prize for Achievement in African Leadership, which awards $5 million to African heads of state who deliver security, health, education and economic development to their constituents and democratically transfer power to their successors.  Ibrahim has pledged to give at least half of his wealth to charity by joining The Giving Pledge.

According to the Forbes 2011 Billionaire List, Mo Ibrahim is worth $1.8 billion, making him the 692nd richest person in the world. Mo Ibrahim was also selected for the TIME "Top 100" list in 2008 and was ranked first in the annual Powerlist of influential Black Britons.

Early life and education
He was born on 3 May 1946 in Sudan, of Nubian descent, the second of five children, four of whom were boys. His family moved to Alexandria, Egypt when he was young, and father Fathi was employed there by a cotton company, and his mother Aida was very keen that they all get a good education.

Ibrahim has a bachelor's degree from Alexandria University in electrical engineering. He returned to Sudan and started working for the telephone company, Sudan Telecom. He moved to England and earned a master's degree from the University of Bradford in Electronics and Electrical Engineering, and a PhD from the University of Birmingham in Mobile Communications.

Career 
Ibrahim is credited with "transforming a continent" and is said to be the "most powerful black man in Britain", in 2008 he was ranked first in the annual Powerlist of the most influential Black Britons.

Ibrahim was employed by British Telecom for a time, and later worked as the technical director for Cellnet, a subsidiary of British Telecom. In 1989 he founded MSI, a consultancy and software company, which in 2000 was bought by the Marconi Company. Originally the company was helping the cellular industry designing their networks, before they shifted their focus to mobile phones in the late 1990s. MSI had 800 employees, who owned approximately 30% of the stock at the point of its sale; Ibrahim says he gave employees stock as a form of bonus.

In 1998, MSI spun off MSI-Cellular Investments, later renamed Celtel, as a mobile phone operator in Africa.

After some years, when Celtel needed long term source of capital, they considered doing an IPO on a reputable stock exchange, for instance the London Stock Exchange. When it became public that they considered a public offering, they received a lot of alternative offers. Many wanted to buy the company, and Ibrahim and his team decided to sell Celtel in 2004 to Kuwait-based Mobile Telecommunication Company (now Zain).

Since 2010, Ibrahim has lent his support to the Broadband Commission for Digital Development, a UN initiative which aims to spread the full benefits of broadband services to unconnected peoples.

Mo Ibrahim Foundation

In 2006 Ibrahim created the Mo Ibrahim Foundation, founded in London. In 2007, the Foundation inaugurated the Mo Ibrahim Prize for Achievement in African Leadership, with the first recipient former president Joaquim Chissano of Mozambique.

The Foundation publishes the Ibrahim Index of African Governance, ranking the performance of all 54 African countries. Until 2009, the Index took into account only the 48 countries in Sub-Saharan Africa.

The Foundation offers scholarships at University of Birmingham, SOAS, and London Business School. These scholarships are on topics of International Development at University of Birmingham, Governance of Development in Africa at SOAS, and  an MBA at London Business School. The scholarships are initiated for African students, both master students and postgraduates.

Other activities 
Ibrahim contributes to the leadership and activities of numerous other organisations, including the B Team, Council on Foreign Relations, Commission on State Fragility, Global Alliance Foundation, ONE, Open Government Partnership, School of Transnational Governance at the European University Institute, the World Bank ID4D and the World Justice Project.

Ibrahim is the co-founder and co-chair of the Africa-Europe Foundation, which was established in 2020 to strengthen Africa-Europe relations.

Awards and honours 
Ibrahim has received multiple awards in recognition of his business and philanthropic activities, including: the GSM Association Chairman’s Award for Lifetime Achievement (2007), The Economist Innovation Award for Social and Economic Innovation (2007), the BNP Paribas Prize for Philanthropy (2008), the Clinton Global Citizen Award (2010), the Eisenhower Medal for Distinguished Leadership and Service (2014), the Foreign Policy Association Medal (2014) and the David Rockefeller Bridging Leadership Award (2012, 2017).

He was made Commander of the Order of the Lion by President Macky Sall of Senegal (2014) and Commander of the Wissam Arch by King Mohammed VI of Morocco (2014).

Ibrahim has been featured in the Time Magazine’s 100 Most Influential People in the World (2008), The New African Most Influential Africans (2014), Bloomberg Markets 50 Most Influential (2015), the Jeune Afrique 100 Most Influential Africans (2019), He is a member of the Hall of Fame for the ‘Powerlist’ of influential black Britons. 

Ibrahim has received honorary degrees, doctorates and fellowships from a range of academic institutions including the University of Birmingham, Bradford University, Cornell University, De Montfort University, Imperial College London, London Business School, the University of Oxford, Royal Academy of Engineering, SOAS University of London, University of Pennsylvania, and Lancaster University.

Ibrahim was appointed Knight Commander of the Order of St Michael and St George (KCMG) in the 2023 New Year Honours for services to charity and philanthropy.

Personal life
In 1973, Ibrahim married Hania Morsi Fadl, an Alexandria University graduate from the year above him, whom he had known since childhood. They are now divorced, and Fadl is a Sudanese-born British radiologist, running the only breast cancer clinic in Sudan.

They have a daughter, Hadeel Ibrahim, who is executive director of the Mo Ibrahim Foundation, vice chair of the Africa Centre in New York, and a board member of the Clinton Foundation; and two sons Hosh and Sami Ibrahim.

Ibrahim resides in the United Kingdom.

References

External links

Mo Ibrahim Foundation, Official Website
Michela Wrong, "Mo Ibrahim" New Statesman, 17 October 2005
Profile from the New Yorker

1946 births
Sudanese engineers
Living people
Academics of London Business School
Alumni of the University of Bradford
Alumni of the University of Birmingham
British Telecom people
British billionaires
British businesspeople
British electrical engineers
British expatriates in Monaco
British philanthropists
Giving Pledgers
21st-century philanthropists
Sudanese emigrants to the United Kingdom
Alexandria University alumni
Knights Commander of the Order of St Michael and St George
Naturalised citizens of the United Kingdom